St Helen's School London is a private day school for girls aged three to eighteen in Northwood, North West London. It is associated with the Merchant Taylors' Company and works in close collaboration with the local Merchant Taylors' School in a range of areas.

History
St Helen's School was founded by May Rowland Brown in 1899. Having been trained as a teacher at Cambridge Training College for Women, she began to teach at Northwood College, which at the time, refused to take in any students that were connected with trade. Whilst still at Northwood College, a group of local businessmen persuaded her to start another school, and at the age of 25,  she founded Northwood High School, later named St Helen's School.

Facilities
St Helen's school occupies a twenty-two acre greenfield site. The Senior school, Junior School and Little Saints occupy separate buildings within the site with their own specialised facilities for their students. The swimming pool is an important facility as many people come for lessons and tutoring after school hours or in the holidays. A new Junior School building opened in September 2016.

The Science Block, containing fourteen laboratories, supports all scientific disciplines. The June-Leader building consists of three Art rooms, three Design and Technology Labs as well as an equipped Drama Studio. The school has recently installed a Virtuoso Language Laboratory in addition to the old one. The Music Block, "Fitzwalter" or "Fitz", possesses sixteen practice rooms, where the school offers lessons for most musical instruments. The Sutherland library, run by a chartered librarian, holds a vast number of books, periodicals, newspapers and computing facilities.

St Helen's School possesses grounds for many sporting activities. With seven tennis courts, two lacrosse pitches, dance Studio, swimming pool, gymnasium and fitness suite, the school has been able to offer an intensive physical education curriculum.

Sports Complex
In July 2004, phase I of the sports complex was completed and was opened by Steve Parry, Olympic Bronze Medalist. It consists of a 25m swimming pool and a "State of the Art" fitness suite. Phase II was finished in summer 2006. This includes the multi gym, dance studio, treatment rooms and observation areas. In 2005, the new swimming pool was used by the female celebrity competitors from The Games television programme for training.

In December 2006, the final phase II of the sports complex was also completed and was opened by Olympic Silver Medalist, Roger Black. A more recent development includes The Centre, which was opened in 2014 and provides space for Drama, Music and Gymnastics as well as a recording studio.

House system

The house system was established in 1927 with three houses named Scott, Shackleton and Bruce. Two of the houses were named after Antarctic explorers – Captain Robert Falcon Scott and Sir Ernest Shackleton, with Bruce named after the Himalayan explorer Brig. Gen. Charles Bruce. A fourth house, Bonington, also named after a Himalayan explorer, has since been added.

Each year the House Cup is awarded to the house with the most points, which can be earned through commendations, Sports Day, House Arts and other achievements.

In 1999, to mark the centenary, Junior School adopted a new house system consisting of 3 houses. The Houses, nominated by the Junior School students, were named after pioneering women in history. Later in 2012 the fourth house was added, named after the American female pilot Amelia Earhart.

Curriculum
Pupils in Middle School (Years 7–9) follow a broader version of the National Curriculum. Upper School pupils (Years 10–11) take English Language and Literature, Mathematics, the Sciences, and at least one Modern Foreign Language and one Humanity course. Students take both GCSE and IGCSE courses, with core subjects studied at IGCSE. Sixth Formers sit A Levels.

St Helen's has regularly performed well in GCSE and A Levels examination league tables. In 2009 candidates achieved a 100% pass rate, all A*-C grades. In 2010 they achieved a 99% pass rate with 96% receiving all A*-B grades. In 2015, the school achieved some of its best results to date with 53%  of entries graded A* and 84% graded A*-A. The pass rate was 99%.

St Helen's School has a very close relationship with Merchant Taylors' School. The girls and boys work together in Drama, Music, the Cadet Corps, Community Support and work with young people with disabilities in the joint Phab initiative (Physically Handicapped and Able Bodied). There are joint careers conferences and a constant and free-ranging exchange of ideas and initiatives.

Notable former pupils
Arts and entertainment

Patricia Hodge, OBE, actress in BBC sitcom Miranda
Penny Johnson, Director of the Government Art Collection
Joan Eardley, painter
Helen Grace, actress
Rachel Petladwala, actress
Dame Ingrid Roscoe, art historian

Business
Paula Nickolds, former Managing Director of John Lewis
Claudine Collins, CCO of MediaCom UK and BBC The Apprentice Interviewer 

Sport

 Jessica Gordon Brown, Commonwealth Silver Medalist for Olympic Weightlifting

Journalism and media
Penny Marshall, journalist
Caroline Daniel, journalist
Magenta Devine, journalist & TV presenter
Luisa Baldini, former BBC News correspondent

Law
Barbara Calvert, barrister and first woman to become a Head of Chambers
Barbara Mills, former Director of Public Prosecutions

Military
Daphne Blundell, former Director of the Women's Royal Naval Service

References

External links
 School Website
 ISI Inspection Reports
 Profile on the ISC website
 Profile on the Good Schools Guide

Private schools in the London Borough of Hillingdon
Educational institutions established in 1899
Private girls' schools in London
International Baccalaureate schools in England
Member schools of the Girls' Schools Association
1899 establishments in England